AZS AJP Gorzów Wielkopolski is a Polish professional women's basketball club that was founded in 2001 in the city of Gorzów Wielkopolski. Club plays in the Basket Liga Kobiet, the highest competition in Poland. In the 2022–23 season the team is also playing in EuroCup Women.

History

Honours

Domestic
Polish League
Runner-up (3): 2008–09, 2009–10, 2018–19
Bronze (4): 2007–08, 2010–11, 2019–20, 2020–21
Polish Basketball Cup
Runner-up (1): 2022–23

European
EuroCup
Round of 16 (4): 2007–08, 2018-19, 2020–21, 2022–23

Season by season

Players

Current roster

Retired numbers

Notable players

European players

  Małgorzata Babicka
  Anne Breitreiner
  Aleksandra Chomać
  Aleksandra Drzewińska
  Katarzyna Dźwigalska
  Dominika Fiszer
  Cheridene Green
  Borislawa Hristova
  Laura Juškaitė
  Agnieszka Kaczmarczyk
  Edyta Koryzna
  Johannah Leedham
  Yelena Leuchanka
  Kyara Linskens
  Magdalena Losi
  Anna Makurat
  Zhosselina Maiga

  Paulina Misiek
  Chioma Nnamaka
  Maryia Papova
  Aleksandra Pawlak
  Izabela Piekarska
  Annamaria Prezelj
  Katarina Ristić
  Yuliya Rytsikava
  Lyudmila Sapova
  Tilbe Şenyürek
  Agnieszka Skobel
  Magdalena Szajtauer
  Agnieszka Szott-Hejmej
  Zoé Wadoux
  Kateřina Zohnová
  Justyna Żurowska-Cegielska

Non-European players

  Lindsay Allen
  Nicky Anosike
  Ariel Atkins
  Kahleah Copper
  Kathleen Doyle
  Angel Goodrich
  Megan Gustafson
  Natalie Hurst
  Chloe Jackson
  Stephanie Jones
  Stella Johnson
  Chineze Nwagbo

  Samantha Richards
  Alanna Smith
  Sidney Spencer
  Carolyn Swords
  Stephanie Talbot
  Lindsay Taylor
  Jasmine Thomas
  Shatori Walker-Kimbrough
  Lyndra Weaver
  Guan Xin
  Sharnee Zoll-Norman

References

External links

 Official polish league website 

Women's basketball teams in Poland
Sport in Gorzów Wielkopolski
Basketball teams established in 2001